, officially known as 
, is a conference center with a hotel in Tennoji-ku, Osaka, Osaka, Japan.

External links

Buildings and structures in Osaka
Tourist attractions in Osaka
Music venues in Japan
Convention centers in Japan
Event venues established in 1987
1987 establishments in Japan